Florian Marino (born 3 June 1993 in Cannes, France) is a French motorcycle racer. In , he replaced PJ Jacobsen on the Triple M Honda Fireblade for two races of the Superbike World Championship in Argentina, becoming injured during the second leg and was unable to compete in the final event at Qatar. He currently competes in the Spanish Superbike Championship, aboard a BMW S1000RR.

Career statistics

Supersport World Championship

Races by year
(key) (Races in bold indicate pole position; races in italics indicate fastest lap)

Grand Prix motorcycle racing

By season

Races by year
(key) (Races in bold indicate pole position; races in italics indicate fastest lap)

Superbike World Championship

Races by year
(key) (Races in bold indicate pole position; races in italics indicate fastest lap)

References

External links

Living people
1993 births
French motorcycle racers
Supersport World Championship riders
Moto2 World Championship riders
FIM Superstock 1000 Cup riders
Superbike World Championship riders